The Australian Customs and Border Protection Service was an Australian federal government agency responsible for managing the security and integrity of the Australian border and facilitating the movement of legitimate international travelers and goods, whilst protecting the safety, security and commercial interests of Australians.  It was headquartered in Canberra and employed over 5,800 people around Australia and overseas.

The agency was under the jurisdiction of the Attorney-General's Department from 2009 to 2013, and then transferred to the newly formed Department of Immigration and Border Protection in 2013, until its transformation into the Australian Border Force in 2015.

Agency role
The Service defined its role as follows:
“Our role is complex and diverse and requires a very considered and increasingly targeted approach to conducting our business. If we do not manage our responsibilities effectively, the potential impacts… may negatively affect the Australian community, international travellers and trade relations both here and overseas” 

The Service was Australia's predominant border control agency. From international travellers at airports, to overseas mail and trade brought in by sea, it was responsible for the continued safety and security of the people and goods that travel across Australia's borders.

In conjunction with the Australian Defence Force, the Service facilitated Australia's response to the detection and rescue of 'suspected irregular entry vessels' that smuggled people from South-East Asia into Australian waters. The agency was also responsible for the discovery and apprehension of 'illegal foreign fishing vessels', the patrol of remote Australian and international waters, and aerial surveillance of Australia's coastline. To achieve these functions, the Service operated its own air and sea patrol unit, the Customs Marine Unit.

The Service used an intelligence-led, risk-based approach to managing threats, focussing on specific targets that may pose a risk to the border. This allowed the agency to plan coordinated responses, interventions and strategies with various other government agencies, including; Australian Crime Commission, Australian Federal Police, Attorney-General's Department, Department of Agriculture, Fisheries and Forestry, Department of Defence, Department of Foreign Affairs and Trade, Department of Immigration and Border Protection and the Office of Transport Security.

Import and export control
Customs controlled the import and export of goods to and from Australia, in particular the control of prohibited or restricted items, and the interception of illegal and potentially harmful goods such as drugs, weapons and computer games. Techniques used to target high-risk aircraft, vessels, cargo, postal items and travellers included using intelligence, computer-based profiling and analysis, detector dogs, Smartgate, container X-ray facilities, closed-circuit television (CCTV) monitoring and other means.

Customs officers at air and sea ports, in addition to performing basic immigration control (see below), assessed passengers arrival and departure cards, and had the authority to scan and search passenger baggage. Quarantine risk material could be referred to Australian Quarantine and Inspection Service officers.

Goods arriving from overseas by post were cleared by Customs and AQIS officers before being released to Australia Post for delivery.

Customs collected goods and services tax (GST) on taxable goods imported into Australia.

Customs administered the Tourist Refund Scheme (TRS) for tourists visiting Australia temporarily or Australian residents leaving the country, allowing them, under certain conditions, to claim a refund of the GST or Wine equalisation tax on items purchased in Australia.

People smuggling
The Service was the lead agency in the Australian government's response to people-smuggling and often performed activities on behalf of other agencies including:
 Monitoring Australian waters for potential people smuggling vessels
 Intercepting boats carrying immigrants without valid visas with Bay Class vessels
 Transporting people found in vessels to Australian territory for immigration and quarantine assessment
 Coordinating education and awareness campaigns overseas to deter people-smuggling activities

Terrorism
The Service operated under the 'National Counter-Terrorism Plan', which was a plan intended to mitigate any risk of terrorism in Australia. The Service worked in conjunction with other Australian Government departments to screen and target any potential threats moving across the border, including:
 Air and sea passengers
 Cargo (sea, air and mail)
 Maritime surveillance
 Remote area patrols

Illegal entry
The Service was responsible for processing all travellers entering and leaving the country. At the border, Service officers would check all passengers to ensure compliance with customs, immigration and quarantine requirements. The Service's purpose was to stop people without correct documentation or visas from entering the country.

Controlled substances
One of the largest areas of work undertaken by the Service was in relation to the importation of narcotics and precursor substances and the smuggling of illegal amounts of tobacco. Examination techniques such as x-ray, trace detection technology and detector dogs were used to screen people, goods, mail, vessels and aircraft moving across Australia's border.

Prohibited material
Australian law prohibits the importing of any material of an offensive, grotesque or otherwise objectionable nature. The Service worked to prevent the importation of material that was either refused classification by the Australian Classification Board, or was unclassified but would likely be refused classification by the Australian Classification Board. This included material in electronic form such as CDs or DVDs, computer hard drives and within electronic games. Prohibited material included, but was not limited to:
 Child pornography
 Offensive or sexualised violence
 Criminal or terrorist material
 Drug use
 Fetish material

Illegal foreign fishing
The Service was the lead agency coordinating regular patrol (both aerial surveillance and on-water) of Australia's 'Exclusive Economic Zone' to detect and deter any foreign fishing vessels. Along with dedicated in-country education programs designed to deter people from undertaking illegal fishing, the Service's work saw a continual decline in the rates of foreign fishing vessels entering the EEZ.

History

Establishment
The Australian Customs and Border Protection Service had its origins in the Department of Trade and Customs, established at federation in 1901. The organisation was restructured several times since, including becoming the Department of Customs and Excise in 1958 and then briefly the Department of Police and Customs in 1975. Later that same year, the Bureau of Customs was established, which remained the Australian Government's customs agency until 1985 when the Australian Customs Service was established.

In December 2008 then Prime Minister Kevin Rudd announced that the Australian Government would be augmenting, re-tasking and renaming the Australian Customs Service to create the new Australian Customs and Border Protection Service. Royal Assent was given to the changes on 22 May 2009 and the Australian Customs and Border Protection Service was established.

Australian Border Force
In 2015, the Australian Government announced changes to the Immigration and Border Protection portfolio in relation to future border protection arrangements. From 1 July 2015, the Department of Immigration and Border Protection and the Australian Customs and Border Protection Service were consolidated into a single Department of Immigration and Border Protection. At this time, the Australian Border Force, a single frontline operational border agency, was established within the department. The Australian Border Force draws together the operational border, investigations, compliance, detention and enforcement functions of the two former agencies, as well as policy, regulatory and corporate functions.

Agency statistics
When it existed, each week the Service would:

Clear
 268,000 air passengers arriving in Australia
 1,620 international flights
 260 ships arriving in Australian ports from overseas
 14 overseas smallcraft
 24,600 export entries
 268,700 air way bills
 48,500 sea cargo manifest lines

Patrol
 Three million square nautical miles including:
 Australia's coastline and seas, including the Southern Ocean and Northern waters
 airports
 sea ports
 mail centres

Inspect
 2000 sea cargo containers
 29,500 air cargo consignments
 776,000 letters
 405,500 parcels from overseas

Collect
 $188 million in revenue from various sources, for Customs and Border Protection and on behalf of other agencies

See also

 Australian Border Force
 Australian Quarantine and Inspection Service
 Fences and Border Protection: The Question of Establishing Technical Barriers in Europe

Notes
Footnotes

Citations

Works cited

Further reading

 
Customs services
2009 establishments in Australia
Government agencies established in 2009
2015 disestablishments in Australia
Defunct Commonwealth Government agencies of Australia